Nalla Sopara (station code NSP) is a railway station on the Western line of the Mumbai Suburban Railway network, serving the town of Nala Sopara.

Nalla Sopara is one of the busiest railway stations in Mumbai. The trains passing through this railway station, travel towards Churchgate in the south and Dahanu Road in the north.

Nalla Sopara station has five footover bridges, all of which are featured with an escalator. Nalla Sopara ranks second busiest railway platform after Andheri.

History 
In 2011, Nalla Sopara alone recorded a 25% increase in first-class commuters from the previous year.

Western Railways widened the platforms at the station in 2012. The project cost about 72 lacs and the construction was completed in July 2012. 

The extra space on platforms helped the railway deal with increased number of passengers due to longer trains, wider bridges and new skywalks. The new bridge was built to provide passengers with another means of walking from platform to platform.

References

Transport in Vasai-Virar
Railway stations in Palghar district
Mumbai Suburban Railway stations
Mumbai WR railway division